The Streptosporangiaceae are a family of bacteria.

References 

Actinomycetota
Bacteria families